KMRE-LP (102.3 Low power FM) is a radio station broadcasting local and regional educational, cultural and historic programming. The station is located in Bellingham, Washington. The FCC granted KMRE-LP its license on July 19, 2006.

Programming 
Featuring music from the Pacific Northwest and more, KMRE-LP also features local news programming and other work from all around Whatcom County. The station also airs music and educational programs.

History 

The meaning behind the call sign for KMRE is the Museum of Radio and Electricity. Broadcasting since 2005 in Bellingham, WA; The station began as part of the Spark Museum of Electrical Invention. The station initially broadcast music and programming from the Golden Age of radio – the 1920s through the advent of television, but evolved to share programming on a wide range of topics.

See also
List of community radio stations in the United States
List of radio stations in Bellingham, WA

References

External links

 

MRE-LP
MRE-LP
Community radio stations in the United States